Muiris mac Torna Ó Maolconaire, dead 1645, was an Irish scribe, historian and poet.

Background

Muiris was a son of Torna Ó Maolconaire, and a native of Cluain Plocáin, County Roscommon. He may have owned land in the parish of Kiltrustan. He was a member of the Ó Maolconaire family, and is sometimes confused with Muirgheas mac Pháidín Ó Maolconaire, another prominent member of Muiris mac Torna's sept, the Sliocht Pháidín.

Annals of the Four Masters

He worked for one month, strictly as a scribe, on the compilation of the Annals of the Four Masters.

According to Bernadette Cunningham (p. 261)

Elegy

After his death in 1645, the poet Maolmhuire mac Eóghain Ó hUiginn composed Máthar na horcha an égsi (Poetry is the mother of sorrow), which emphasised his work as a poet, rather than that of a historian, genealogist or scribe. He was the only individual of the six-member team who compiled the Four Masters who was

 (Cunningham, p. 262)

This is confirmed by a note written by Sir James Ware about 1636, when he recorded that he received the vellum fragment of annals he knew as Annales Prioratus Insulae Omnium SS in Loghree (now Bodleian MS Rawlinson B 488, folios 29-34) from Muiris mac Torna in August 1627 (dono dedit Mauritius Conry 27 Augusti 1627.)

Sources

 Marbhna ar Mhuiris Mac Torna Uí Mhaoilchonaire, Réamann Ó Muireadhaigh, Eigse 15:3 (1974), pp. 295–21.
 Muirgheas Ó Maolconaire of Cluain Plocáin: an early sixteenth-century Connacht scribe at work, Bernadette Cunningham and Raymond Gillespie, Studia Hibernica 35 (2008–09), pp. 17–43.
 Muiris Ó Maolconaire, in Dictionary of Irish biography (9 vols, Cambridge, 2009)
 The Annals of the Four Masters: Irish history, kingship and society in the early seventeenth century, p. 60, 142-3, 261, 262, 275,   Bernadette Cunningham, Four Courts Press, 2010. .

Irish scribes
1645 deaths
Irish-language poets
17th-century Irish writers
Year of birth unknown
Irish scholars and academics